Malice Mizer (stylized as MALICE MIZER) was a Japanese visual kei rock band active from August 1992 to December 2001. Formed by guitarists Mana and Közi, their earlier music and themes were characterized by their strong French and classical influences, later moving away from deliberate French romanticism and incorporating Gothic aspects after several difficulties befell the band. Their official fan club is named "Ma chérie".

Malice Mizer was as famous for their live shows as they were for their music, featuring lavish historical costumes and stage sets, short silent theater pieces preluding various songs, and even a particularly notable instance of the vocalist descending to Earth (the stage) as a fallen angel, only to ascend again at the end of the concert. Throughout their history, the band has gone through several different lineups and three drastic image changes. At their peak, they were considered one of "the big four of visual kei" alongside La'cryma Christi, Fanatic Crisis and Shazna. On December 11, 2001, it was announced that Malice Mizer would go on an indefinite hiatus. Mana, Közi and bassist Yu~ki have performed together several times since 2010.

History

1992–1994: Tetsu era

After leaving Matenrou, guitarists Mana and Közi formed Malice Mizer in August 1992 with Tetsu on vocals, Yu~ki on bass and Gaz on drums. The band's name is a coined word for "Malice and Misery ", extracted from "Nothing but a being of malice and tragedy."  — their reply to the question "What is a human being?" From the outset, the band established their trademark "twin guitar"' sound, whereby two guitars play different melodies creating polyphony. Malice Mizer's sound during the Tetsu era was a mixture of early 1980s gothic rock, progressive rock and strong classical influences. Their first official release was the song "Speed of Desperate" on the 1993 compilation Brain Trash. Before this, they had released a demo tape called "Sans Logique" (a nod to French pop singer Mylène Farmer's hit song "Sans Logique") which contained no vocals. Shortly after the release of Brain Trash, Gaz left the band to join Kneuklid Romance, while Kneuklid Romance's drummer Kami in turn joined Malice Mizer. In 1994, after a couple more demos, the band released their debut album Memoire on Mana's newly founded independent record label Midi:Nette. It was re-released it at the end of the year with an additional bonus track, "Baroque", under the title Memoire DX. Only days later, singer and lyricist Tetsu left the band after his last gig on December 27, 1994. While the exact reasons are unknown, Tetsu went on to take a different direction in his work. The band's continued use of his lyrics in songs they continued to perform with later vocalists suggest an amicable split.

1995–1999: Gackt era

After almost a year of inactivity, Malice Mizer recruited Gackt as their new vocalist and released the single "Uruwashiki Kamen no Shoutaijou" on December 10, 1995. It was with this single that Malice Mizer started to actively differentiate themselves from other bands; when the song was performed live, Mana and Közi put down their guitars and instead performed a dance routine. With a new concept, the band's music became more art rock and synthpop, incorporating even stronger classical and electronic elements. Visually, the band abandoned their 1980s goth look for colorful historical costumes with a gothic feel.

Malice Mizer released their second album, Voyage ~Sans Retour~, in 1996, and their first home video in 1997; Sans Retour Voyage "Derniere" ~Encore Une Fois~, a concert video recorded at Shibuya Public Hall featuring an elaborate stage and dance routines. The band became increasingly popular and signed with major record label Nippon Columbia that same year, where they released a number of successful singles and a short film, Bel Air ~Kuuhaku no Toki no Naka de~ de L'image. Their major label debut album, Merveilles, was released in 1998. The band even had their own radio show around this time and played a two-day live at the Nippon Budokan, which involved a large building as a stage prop and elaborate theatrics; each member performing a skit with another member on their own (including [on "Le Ciel"] the aforementioned skit in which Gackt fell to the stage [to sing the song] and returned to "Heaven" by song's end). It was a massive success and was released on video as merveilles ~Shuuen to kisuu~ l'espace. In July 1998, the Yokohama Arena's stage would be the last for Gackt as in January 1999, at the height of Malice Mizer's success, he would suddenly leave the band. No reason was given, but after just four months he would release his first solo EP. Malice Mizer left Nippon Columbia shortly after and returned to Midi:Nette (established as Midi:Nette M.†.M).

A few months after Gackt's departure, drummer Kami died of a subarachnoid hemorrhage on June 21, 1999. He left behind a handful of songs, which the band eventually released as part of the EP/video boxset Shinwa, which consists of two songs composed by him and the short track "Saikai" written by the band. Kami was never officially replaced; from that point on, Malice Mizer would only use support drummers (namely ex-Aion member Shu, who is not shown in the band's later promotional material, nor credited) and Kami would be credited as "eternal blood relative" on all their future releases. Possibly due to Kami's death and other factors, the band shifted to a "darker" image and sound.

2000–2001: Klaha era
In the second half of 1999 and the beginning of 2000, Malice Mizer, still without an official vocalist, released a number of singles and began to work on a new album. Eventually, they recruited Klaha (vocalist of dark wave band Pride of Mind), officially inducted into the band as a full member in January. By then the band had abandoned the lighter pop music sound of the Gackt era for a dramatic mixture of classical music, dark wave, with slight heavy metal elements, and adopted an elaborate funerary elegant gothic look. In the summer of 2000, they released what would be their last album, Bara no Seidou. On August 31 and September 1, they gave a theatrical two-day live at the Nippon Budokan, featuring pyrotechnics, a choir of veiled nuns and a scaled-down cathedral as a stage prop. In 2001, Malice Mizer starred in a feature-length vampire movie (Bara no Konrei ~Mayonaka ni Kawashita Yakusoku~), and released three more singles: "Gardenia", "Beast of Blood" and "Garnet ~Kindan no Sono e~"; "Gardenia" and "Garnet" being of a considerably lighter tone than their previous album, suggesting another new era for the band. However, the band members decided to go their own separate ways in 2001, leaving messages on their official website, which can still be viewed today. The split was spoken of as a "hiatus", so as not to exclude the possibility of a future reformation.

Post projects
After his departure in 1994, Tetsu released one solo album, and has subsequently taken part in a series of bands such as Zigzo, Mega 8 Ball, Nil; his most recent being The JuneJulyAugust.

After his departure in early 1999, Gackt started a solo career a year later which has been enormously successful; he is one of Japan's top musicians and TV personalities.

Klaha started a solo career as well in December 2002, but in the middle of 2004 it was announced that his fan club would be closing down, and after that there have been long periods of silence, only broken by rare updates on his site. In 2007 he stated on his site that he would resume musical activity that year. But this did not happen and no information has been announced since.

Yu~ki has not been active on the music scene since 2004 when he wrote the song "Memento", about Kami, for Közi's solo project. In an informal conversation with Klaha, he said he would like to return to the music scene.

Közi formed the industrial duo Eve of Destiny with Haruhiko Ash (ex:The Zolge) and also started a solo career. As of Halloween 2008 he is part of the band Dalle. Around June 2010, Közi started to perform with a band called My Horror Revue. He has also formed the band XA-VAT, who held their first performance on November 16, 2010 and released their first single on December 2. In 2012, he formed the band ZIZ with the musicians who supported him with his solo career.

Mana has formed his own solo project Moi dix Mois, which has performed live concerts across Europe. In addition to the successful solo project, Mana is a designer for his fashion label Moi-même-Moitié (created in 1999), which focuses on the styles Elegant Gothic Aristocrat and Elegant Gothic Lolita. He also continues to run his indie record label Midi:Nette, and has produced for artists such as Schwarz Stein and Kanon Wakeshima.

Malice Mizer's song "Gekka no Yasoukyoku" was covered by D on the compilation Crush! -90's V-Rock Best Hit Cover Songs-, which was released on January 26, 2011 and features current visual kei bands covering songs from bands that were important to the '90s visual kei movement. Their song "Illuminati" was covered by Moran on its sequel, Crush! 2 -90's V-Rock Best Hit Cover Songs-, that was released on November 23, 2011.

Original drummer Gaz died on December 22, 2017, due to illness.

Deep Sanctuary reunions

Since 2008, Mana's band Moi dix Mois has held a special event, most taking place every two years, which has had some sort of connection to Malice Mizer. The first was Dis Inferno Vol.VI ~Last Year Party~ on December 27, 2008, where Malice Mizer's "Speed of Desperate" was played in a session by Mana on drums, Közi on guitar and Mana's cousin  on vocals. Közi said that this was the first time he and Mana had met since 2001. In 2009, Moi dix Mois and Közi went on a short two-date tour called Deep Sanctuary, on July 17 in Osaka and the 19th in Tokyo.

A year later in July 2010, Közi once again went on a tour with Moi dix Mois, titled Deep Sanctuary II. This tour had six shows, but the gig at Akasaka Blitz on the 17th was special, as Yu~ki was a special guest. This was the first time in 9 years that the three original members of Malice Mizer played together, and they were supported by Hayato (Moi dix Mois) on drums. They played "Saikai no Chi to Bara" and "Beast of Blood", as well as a cover of Rob Zombie's "What Lurks on Channel X?". In 2012, the three played together twice more for Deep Sanctuary III; once on September 12 at Akasaka Blitz and again on November 14, 2012 at Osaka Muse Hall.

In 2014, another reunion of the three original members happened for Deep Sanctuary IV at Akasaka Blitz on October 11. This marked the first time they performed under the Malice Mizer name since 2001. It was followed by Deep Sanctuary V at Akasaka Blitz on August 7, 2016. On September 8 and 9, 2018, Mana, Közi, and Yu~ki reunited as Malice Mizer to perform two shows for the band's 25th anniversary special at Tokyo Toyosu Pit. Titled Deep Sanctuary VI, Moi dix Mois and ZIZ also performed. They were supported on drums by Sakura, who was Kami's drum mentor, and who used Kami's original drum kit for the show. Mana tried reaching out to Tetsu, Gackt and Klaha regarding their participation, but the first two declined and he was unable to reach the third. Instead, the band's former roadies Shuji (Cali Gari), Kamijo, and Hitomi filled in as guest vocalists. A Blu-ray of the concert was released on June 21, 2019.

Deep Sanctuary VII was scheduled to take place at Mynavi Blitz Akasaka on June 7, 2020, but was cancelled due to the COVID-19 pandemic in Japan.

Influences
Mana stated that the  opening theme music scared him a lot in childhood and Malice Mizer's music has its roots in that experience.

Members
 Mana – guitar, keyboards, synthesizers, percussion (1992–2001, 2010, 2012, 2014, 2016, 2018)
 Közi – guitar, keyboards, synthesizers, percussion, backing vocals (1992–2001, 2010, 2012, 2014, 2016, 2018)
 Yu~ki – bass, contrabass, percussion (1992–2001, 2010, 2012, 2014, 2016, 2018)

Former members
 Klaha – vocals (2000–2001)
 Gaz – drums (1992–1993; died 2017)
 Tetsu – vocals (1992–1994)
 Gackt – vocals, piano (1995–1999)
 Kami – drums (1993–1999; died 1999)

Support members
 Shu "Shue" Sakai – drums (2000–2001)
 Kazune – keyboards, synthesizers (2000–2001)
 Hayato – drums (2010, 2012, 2014, 2016)
 sakura – drums (2018)

Timeline

Discography

Studio albums
 Memoire (1994)
 Voyage Sans Retour (1996)
 Merveilles (1998)
 Bara no Seidou (2000)

Notes

References

External links
 Official website

 
Visual kei musical groups
Japanese art rock groups
Japanese gothic rock groups
Japanese dark wave musical groups
Japanese progressive rock groups
Nippon Columbia artists
Musical groups established in 1992
Musical groups disestablished in 2001
Musical quartets
1992 establishments in Japan
2001 disestablishments in Japan
Articles which contain graphical timelines